A flush is a hand of playing cards where all cards are of the same suit. There are different types of flush, including straight, where the flush is formed from a run of cards in unbroken sequence of ranks. Flushes are one of the types of scoring hand in poker.

Etymology 
The general meaning of the word flush is fullness or abundance, as there are similar meaning words in Dutch, French, Italian and Spanish.  The words origin is 'fluxus' in Latin, which means 'flow'.

Types of flush 

Certain games recognise different types of flush. For example, in poker, there are the following:
 Flush: any 5 cards of the same suit
 Straight flush: 5 consecutive cards of the same suit
 Royal flush: an ace high straight flush, the highest possible straight flush
 Nut flush: the highest possible flush.

Examples

References

See also
Glossary of card game terms
Flush (poker)
List of poker hands

Card game terminology